Lekkas or Lekas is a Greek surname. The female version of the name is Lekka (Λέκκα). Notable examples include:

Men 
Angelo Lekkas (born 1976), Australian rules footballer
Marios Lekkas (born 1979), fashion model
Vassilis Lekkas, Greek popular/folk and rock singer

Women 
Christina Lekka (born c. 1972), fashion model from Akron, Ohio

See also 
Lekas, a municipality in Albania
Leka (disambiguation)

Greek-language surnames
Surnames